"R.S.V.P." is the name of a 1985 single by British pop group Five Star. The single was the sixth UK release from their debut album Luxury of Life, released in the summer of 1985. The single peaked at no.45 in the UK.

7" single:  PB40445  
 R.S.V.P. (Edit – 3:28)
 Say Goodbye

7" single Limited poster bag:  PB40445 
 R.S.V.P. (Edit – 3:28)
 Say Goodbye
+ bonus cassette (FSK001) of rare 12" versions of 'Hide And Seek' / 'Crazy'

12" single:  PT40446
 R.S.V.P. (Remix S’il Vous Plait)
 R.S.V.P. (Original Philly Mix)
 R.S.V.P. (Urban Remix)
 Love Games 
 Say Goodbye

All tracks available on the remastered versions of either the 2010 'Luxury Of Life' album, the 2013 'The Remix Anthology (The Remixes 1984-1991)' or the 2018 'Luxury - The Definitive Anthology 1984-1991' boxset.

Five Star songs
1985 singles
Song recordings produced by Nick Martinelli
Songs written by Paul Gurvitz
1985 songs
RCA Records singles